Jiří Hoffmann (24 May 1908 – 21 November 1983) was a Czech athlete. He competed in the men's long jump at the 1936 Summer Olympics.

References

1908 births
1983 deaths
Athletes (track and field) at the 1936 Summer Olympics
Czech male long jumpers
Olympic athletes of Czechoslovakia
Place of birth missing